The 2014 Philippine Collegiate Championship was the seventh edition of the Philippine Collegiate Champions League (PCCL) in its current incarnation, the postseason tournament to determine the national collegiate champions in basketball organized by the Samahang Basketbol ng Pilipinas (SBP), the national basketball federation. The tournament was the seventh edition in its current incarnation, and the twelfth edition overall

The San Beda Red Lions defeated defending champions De La Salle Green Archers in the best-of-three championship series, 2–0; meanwhile the UV Green Lancers defeated the USC Warriors in the third-place game, 63–60.

Qualifying
*Replaced by CEU.

Regionals

Luzon–Metro Manila
The rounds were held at the First Asia Institute of Technology and Humanities (FAITH) Gym in Tanauan, Batangas from November 7 to 10.

First 3 rounds

Semifinals

Finals

Visayas–Mindanao

Quarterfinals

Semifinals

Finals

Elite Eight
Teams from Group A will battle against teams from Group B

Team standings

Group A

Group B

Results

Third-place playoff

Finals

2014
2014–15 in Philippine basketball leagues